Somnang Alyna (born 24 February 2001) is a Cambodian model and beauty pageant titleholder who was crowned Miss Universe Cambodia 2019. As Miss Universe Cambodia, she represented Cambodia at the Miss Universe 2019 pageant.

Personal life 
Alyna was born and raised at Phnom Penh. Alyna is a first year student at the Pannasastra University of Cambodia majoring, in International Relations. She is the eldest among four siblings.

Pageantry

World Miss University 2017 
She represented Cambodia at the World Miss University 2017. Where she was placed as the Top16.

Miss Universe Cambodia 2019 
Alyna first applied in 2018 along with 24 other candidates.

Alyna bested 24 other candidates and won Miss Universe Cambodia 2019.

Miss Universe 2019 
Alyna will represent Cambodia at Miss Universe 2019. If she wins, she will promote women's welfare through education. She also wants to help poor and orphan children go to schools so that they can all have a better future. As a public speaker, she wants to inspire all young people to pay attention to their education.

References

External links
 

 

2001 births
Living people
Miss Universe 2019 contestants
Cambodian beauty pageant winners
Cambodian female models